Teziutlán is a city in the northeast of the Mexican state of Puebla. Its 2005 census population was 60,597. It also serves as the municipal seat for the surrounding Teziutlán Municipality. The municipality has an area of 84.2 km2 (32.51 sq mi) and a population of 88,970.

The area is drained by the Río El Calvario,  Río Xóloatl and Río Xoloco rivers.

Teziutlán is described in some guidebooks as a "picturesque colonial town". It was founded (by spaniar) on 15 March 1552 at a location known to the locals as "Teziuhyotepetzintlancingo". means "Little mount with hailstones". The name Teziutlán is Nahuatl, and means "place with hailstones".

During the presidency of Porfirio Díaz, the town gained prosperity, and it is described as "a commercial town of importance, very often visited by traveling salesmen from businesses in this country and abroad... It depends on a group of businesses that handle significant capital and sell on a large scale in the principal markets of Europe and the United States."<ref>José Mendizábal, Almanque de efemérides del Estado de Puebla para el año de 1898 (Mexico 1898, p. 70) quoted in Enrique Krauze, Mexico: Biography of Power. New York: Harper Collins 1997, 491.</ref>  Teziutlán was linked to the expanding railway network during the Porfiriato presidency, which aided its prosperity.

Climate
The climate is highland subtropical but ever moist (Köppen: Cfb) similar to the plateaus of southern Brazil, but with longer soft periods of time.

Famous residents
The city is noteworthy as the birthplace of two prominent twentieth-century politicians: 
Manuel Ávila Camacho (24 April 1897 – 13 October 1955), President of Mexico from 1940 to 1946.
Vicente Lombardo Toledano (16 July 1894 – 16 November 1968), founder of the Confederación de Trabajadores de México (CTM).

The city has also been the birthplace of other prominent figures:
 Maximino Ávila Camacho, brother of Manuel Ávila Camacho, governor of Puebla and federal secretary of public works.
 Juan Cordero (16 May 1824 – 28 May 1884), an award-winning painter.
 Antonio Espino Mora (13 August 1910 – 24 November 1993), who starred on stage, screen, and television as "Clavillazo".
Alfredo "El Güero" Gil (5 January 1915 – 10 September 1999), lead guitarist for El Trío Los Panchos.
 Xavier Robles (b. 25 February 1949), motion picture screenwriter whose credits include Rojo Amanecer''.
 Francisco Rocafuerte (b. 2 April 1962) International Concert Pianist and Conductor. he have performed concerts around the world.
https://franciscorocafuerte.wixsite.com/frocafuerte/bio-english
Cayetano Arámburo (b. 29 July 1990) Mexican series/soap opera actor.

References

External links

Link to tables of population data from Census of 2005 INEGI: Instituto Nacional de Estadística, Geografía e Informática
Puebla Enciclopedia de los Municipios de México 
Cabecera Municipal de Teziutlán Official website 
Teziutlán (Puebla state government tourism pages) 

Populated places in Puebla